Castiraga Vidardo is a comune (municipality) in the Province of Lodi in the Italian region Lombardy, located about  southeast of Milan and about  southwest of Lodi.

Castiraga Vidardo borders the following municipalities: Salerano sul Lambro, Borgo San Giovanni, Caselle Lurani, Marudo, Sant'Angelo Lodigiano.

The double name of this village comes from the two biggest frazioni, Castiraga da Reggio and Vidardo, previously part of the commune of Marudo.

References

External links
 Official website

Cities and towns in Lombardy